The Meudon Formation is a geologic formation in France. It preserves fossils dating back to the Paleogene period.

See also

 List of fossiliferous stratigraphic units in France

References
 

Paleogene France